Kalateh-ye Mansurabad (also Romanized as Kalāteh-ye Manṣūrābād) is a village in Daman Kuh Rural District, in the Central District of Esfarayen County, North Khorasan Province, Iran. At the 2006 census, its population was 23, in 5 families.

References 

Populated places in Esfarayen County